Kirulapone (Kirulapana) is a suburb in Colombo, Sri Lanka which is also known as Colombo 5.

The A4 (High Level Road) runs through Kirulapone while Elvitigala Mawatha (Narahenpita Road), which leads to the Katunayake Airport (CMB) begins from here.

Places of Interest 
 Best Western Elyon Colombo Hotel
 Calvary Church
 Ministry of Finance and Mass Media
 Poorvaramaya Buddhist Temple

Schools 
 Mahamathya Maha Vidyalaya (fromally Bhadrawathie Vidyalaya)
 Lanka Shaba College
 Asian International School
 Ilma International Girls' School
 Royal Institute Girls' School

Transport 
 Bus-138 route (Fort-Maharagama)
 Bus 120 route (Pettah-Piliyandala )
 Bus 122 route (Pettah-Awissawella)
 Bus 125 route (Pettah-Padukka/Ingiriya)
 Bus 141 route (Wellawatte-Narahenpita)
Train - Kirulapone Railway Station

References

Populated places in Western Province, Sri Lanka